IGF2 antisense RNA is a protein that in humans is encoded by the IGF2-AS gene.

Function

This gene is expressed in antisense to the insulin-like growth factor 2 (IGF2) gene and is imprinted and paternally expressed. It is thought to be non-coding because the putative protein is not conserved and translation is predicted to trigger nonsense mediated decay (NMD). Transcripts from this gene are produced in tumors and may function to suppress cell growth. Alternative splicing results in multiple transcript variants. [provided by RefSeq, Nov 2015].

References

Further reading